Society is a 1989 American body horror film directed by Brian Yuzna and starring Billy Warlock, Devin DeVasquez, Evan Richards, and Ben Meyerson. Its plot follows a Beverly Hills teenager who begins to suspect that his wealthy parents are part of a gruesome cult for the social elite.

Though the film was completed in 1989, it was not released until 1992. It was Yuzna's directorial debut and was written by Rick Fry, conceived and written by Woody Keith. Screaming Mad George was responsible for the special effects. A sequel, Society 2: Body Modification, was in development as of 2013, with a script written by Stephan Biro.

Plot
Bill Whitney lives with his parents and sister in a mansion in Beverly Hills, California. Bill tells his therapist Dr. Cleveland that he does not trust his rich family. When his sister's ex-boyfriend David Blanchard gives him a surreptitiously recorded audio tape of what sounds like his family engaged in a murderous orgy, Bill begins to suspect that his feelings are justified. Bill gives the tape to Dr. Cleveland, but when he later plays it back, the audio has changed to his sister's coming out party. When Bill attempts to meet Blanchard to obtain another copy, he finds an ambulance and police officers gathered around Blanchard's crashed van. A body is placed into the back of the ambulance, but Bill is prevented from seeing its face.

Bill attends a party hosted by his rich classmate Ted Ferguson, who confirms the first tape was real. Angry and confused, Bill leaves the party with Clarissa, a beautiful girl he had been admiring. The next day, Bill confronts his parents and sister. At Blanchard's funeral, Bill and his friend Milo discover Blanchard's corpse may be fake. Bill is contacted by Martin Petrie, his rival for the high school presidency. At their arranged meeting, Bill discovers Petrie with his throat cut. When he returns with the police, the body is gone. The next day at school, Petrie shows up, alive and well. When Bill arrives at home, he confronts his family again, but with Dr. Cleveland's help, Bill is drugged. As Milo trails him, Bill is taken to a hospital, where he awakens thinking he hears Blanchard crying out, but discovers nothing is there. Milo and Clarissa try to warn him, but he drives back to his house.

At home, Bill finds a large, formal party. Dr. Cleveland reveals that Bill's family and their rich friends are actually an entirely different species from Bill. To demonstrate, they bring in a still-living Blanchard. The wealthy party guests strip to their underwear and begin "shunting"—physically deforming and melding with each other—as they suck the nutrients from Blanchard's body, absorbing him. Their intention is to do the same to Bill, but he escapes and runs around the house, finding his family engaged in similarly disgusting activities. He confronts Ferguson, killing him by reaching inside him mid-shunt and pulling him inside-out. Bill escapes with the help of Milo and Clarissa, who is also of the alternate species, but has fallen in love with Bill.

Cast

Production

After having several of his productions fail for lack of finding a director, Yuzna decided to move into directing. As producer of Re-Animator, he held the rights to a sequel and knew he could find financing. He used this as leverage for a two-picture deal, the first of which turned into Society.  Yuzna said that he wanted the safety of having two pictures to establish himself as a successful director.  Societys script appealed to Yuzna partly because it was thematically similar to a failed project he had begun with Dan O'Bannon.  Yuzna altered the script from a traditional slasher film climax about a religious cult to the surrealistic aliens.  The production company introduced him to Screaming Mad George, who they knew to also be interested in surreal gore.  For the film's most surreal and gory sequence, the "shunting," Yuzna based it on his nightmares.  The sequence was further inspired by The Great Masturbator, a Dali painting.  Author Jon Towlson identifies political themes imported from paranoid science fiction thrillers, such as Invasion of the Body Snatchers and Invaders from Mars.  Yuzna later cited the film's mix of paranoia, black humor, satire, and gore as alienating mainstream audiences.

Release
Society premiered at the Shock Around the Clock Film Festival in London in 1989.  For its British release, Society was marketed in Video Trade Weekly with a picture of the film's theatrical premiere.  Mark Kermode called this "stupid yet brilliant", as it demonstrated that the distributor did not know how to market the film properly but also showed recognition that traditional marketing for a genre film was irrelevant.  Society was a success in Europe, but was shelved for three years before getting a release in the U.S.  Said director Yuzna in an interview: "I think Europeans are more willing to accept the ideas that are in a movie.  That's why for example Society did really well in Europe and in the US did nothing, where it was a big joke. And I think it's because they responded to the ideas in there. I was totally having fun with them, but they are there nonetheless."

Arrow Video released a limited edition Blu-ray in the UK on June 8 and in the US on June 9, 2015.  It includes new interviews and artwork, a comic book sequel, and a music video by Screaming Mad George.

Critical response
In 1990, Society won the Silver Raven award for "Best Make-Up" at the Brussels International Festival of Fantasy Film.  Tom Tunney of Empire rated it 4/5 stars and wrote, "Way ahead of its time, this is a balls-out satire on the disgraceful layers that can lurk just beneath the Avon surface. This is anti-Ferris Bueller and fiendishly funny."  Variety described it as "an extremely pretentious, obnoxious horror film that unsuccessfully attempts to introduce kinky sexual elements into extravagant makeup effects".  Michael Wilmington of the Los Angeles Times wrote, "No one who sees the last half-hour of this movie will ever forget it—though quite a few may want to."  Marc Savlov of The Austin Chronicle wrote that the British press, who gave the film positive reviews, overrated it and stated that it would not play well to American audiences.

In the early 2010s, Time Out London conducted a poll with several authors, directors, actors, and critics who have worked within the horror genre to vote for their top horror films. Society placed at number 95 on their top 100 list.  Bartlomiej Paszylk wrote in The Pleasure and Pain of Cult Horror Films that the film has "one of the craziest and most disgusting endings in movie history".

On the review aggregator website Rotten Tomatoes, Society holds a 62% approval rating based on 13 reviews, with an average rating of 5.50/10.

Adaptation
Scottish comic book company Rough Cut Comics acquired the comic book rights to Society in 2002, producing an official sequel.

The comic book series returned in 2003 with Society: Party Animal by writer Colin Barr and artists Shelby Robertson (issue 1) and Neill Cameron (issue 2).

References

External links
 
 
 

1989 films
1989 horror films
1980s comedy horror films
1989 independent films
1980s satirical films
American comedy horror films
American independent films
American mystery horror films
American satirical films
1980s English-language films
American body horror films
Films set in Beverly Hills, California
Films adapted into comics
Films about cults
1989 directorial debut films
1989 comedy films
Films directed by Brian Yuzna
American monster movies
American exploitation films
1980s American films